In Pasadena, Texas, Talley and Lewis W. Nichols founded a cap gun business that would ultimately grow to become one of the biggest cap gun manufacturers in the world.

History

World War II had just ended, and they wanted to manufacture something. After several ideas, they decided to make toys, specifically toy cap guns. The primary choice was a cap pistol that resembled a 19th-century version of the famous Colt Peacemaker in some way, as that was an extremely popular revolver.

Their first gun, the Silver Pony, was made and orders were brisk. The success of this initial offering led to the Mustang (later called the Silver Mustang) and the Silver Colt. But these were somewhat ordinary cap guns, and being small, they ventured out and created a large cap gun called the Stallion 45. In 1950, the Stallion 45 was introduced at the New York Toy Fair and became a sensation. It was declared the "Toy of the Year." Besides its large size, which was essentially the same size as its namesake, it featured individual 2-piece bullets, which would hold a single cap and when the gun was fired, the cylinder revolved, the bullet fired, and smoke came out of the end of the barrel. One of the features of the Stallion series was that all sparking from the caps was contained within the bullet, thus eliminating the objection from some states that the sparks might harm children's eyes. In those states, there were "dummy" guns sold which could not fire a cap.

The success of this gun was overwhelming and thus a dynasty of smaller and different versions of Stallions were also created: the Stallion 38, Stallion 32, Stallion 22, Stallion .41-40 and Stallion Model 61. Though the Stallion 300 Saddle Gun also had the name Stallion, it was a rifle that looked like a .30-30 Winchester.

In 1954, the company moved to Jacksonville, Texas and officially opened in 1955. The entire county basically turned out for the gala event, and their manufacturing capabilities were greatly expanded. Many new models were created, with several variations of each. In 1957 the Stallion 45 MK-II was created, which many cap gun collectors have declared to be the "King of the Die-Cast Cap Guns." The magazine, American Rifleman, even ran a featured article on cap guns and featured this gun.

The Nichols cap pistols featured a revolving cylinder that advanced when the trigger was pulled. The company also offered a repair service where a gun could be mailed to the factory and repaired for a very small fraction of the original price.

By 1962 the matinée idols like Roy Rogers, Gene Autry, The Lone Ranger, Hopalong Cassidy and many others were gradually making fewer movies and television shows, and children's interest in cap guns began waning. Nichols Industries sold out to Kusan in 1965, which continued many of the cap gun models. Eventually, cap guns began to fade from the scene and even Kusan and many other famous companies like George Schmidt, Kilgore, Hubley, Mattel, Esquire, Wyandotte, Stevens, etc., were forced to cut back or sell out completely. Thus ended the "Glory Days" of the cap guns.

Now, cap guns are collectibles and are highly valued in auctions like EBay and flea markets and private sales. The prices are quite high compared to the original guns and full sets of guns and holsters and other memorabilia of the period-especially the boxes are considered great prizes. Many people are "exclusive" collectors and only collect Nichols cap guns or other individual brands. With the new restrictions on cap guns, it is becoming more difficult to collect historical toys like this and thus preserve our heritage. These days, cap guns are required by law to either be a different color or have an orange plug in the ends of their barrels, so that law enforcement officers can tell the difference. Toy guns manufactured prior to 1988 are not required to have this feature. By 1988, most of the famous toy cap gun companies had already gone out of business, Nichols Industries being one of them.

External links 
NicholsCapGuns.com The largest cap gun website on the internet with thousands of photos of cap guns and the history of the manufacturers-especially Nichols Industries.

Defunct toy manufacturers
Manufacturing companies established in 1947
American companies established in 1947
1947 establishments in Texas